Bioderma Laboratories is a privately owned French pharmaceutical company that specialises in medication for dermatological and hair/scalp conditions, as well as for Pediatry and cell regeneration. It was founded in 1977, in Aix en Provence, where its headquarters still reside. However, in 2001, the company opened its first specialised biometrology lab for skincare research and development in Lyon. 
Its primary business sector is Dermatology, with products such as ABCDerm, Atoderm, Cicabio, Créaline, Hydrabio, Matriciane, Matricium, Sébium, White Objective, secure (skin care), Nodé (hair care) and Photoderm (sun care).

References 

French companies established in 1977
Pharmaceutical companies of France
Pharmaceutical companies established in 1977
Companies based in Provence-Alpes-Côte d'Azur
French brands
bn:বায়োডার্মা